HMS Tonbridge was a Hunt-class minesweeper of the Royal Navy from World War I, named after the town of Tonbridge.

References
 

 

Hunt-class minesweepers (1916)
1918 ships